Kaido is an Estonian and Finnish given name, a masculine form of Kaidi – a variant of Katariina ("Katherine (given name)").

People named Kaido include:
Kaido Höövelson (Baruto Kaito; born 1984), sumo wrestler
Kaido Kaaberma (born 1968), fencer
Kaido Kalm (born 1965), ice sledge hockey player and Paralympic competitor
Kaido Kama (born 1957), politician
Kaido Kreen (born 1965), volleyball player
Kaido Külaots (born 1976), chess Grandmaster
Kaido Ole (born 1963), painter
Kaido Põldma (born 1980), musician (Soul Militia)
Kaido Reivelt (born 1970), physicist, researcher and educator 
Kaido Saks (born 1986), basketball player
Kaido Veermäe (born 1971), actor

References

See also
Kaidō

Estonian masculine given names